Nehemiah Eastman (June 16, 1782 – January 11, 1856) was an American lawyer, banker and politician from New Hampshire. He served as a member of the United States House of Representatives, the New Hampshire Senate and the New Hampshire House of Representatives in the early 1800s.

Early life
Born in Gilmanton, New Hampshire, Eastman was the son of Ebenezer and Mary (Butler) Eastman. He attended the local academy in Gilmanton and then read law with John Curtis Chamberlain, future member of the United States House of Representatives. He was admitted to the bar in 1807 and began the practice of law in Farmington, New Hampshire.

Political career
Eastman began his political career as a member of the New Hampshire House of Representatives in 1813. He served in the New Hampshire Senate from 1820 to 1825. Elected as an Adams candidate to the Nineteenth Congress, Eastman served as United States Representative for the state of New Hampshire from March 4, 1825 to March 3, 1827. After leaving Congress, he resumed the practice of law. In 1834, Eastman and James Farrington organized the Rochester Bank in Rochester, New Hampshire.

Death
Eastman died in Farmington, Strafford County, New Hampshire, on January 11, 1856. He is interred at Farmington Cemetery in Farmington, New Hampshire.

Personal life
On October 24, 1813, Eastman married Anstriss Barker Woodbury in Francestown, New Hampshire and they had four children: Charles, Martha Ann, George Nehemiah, and Henry Patrick. His brother-in-law was Levi Woodbury, an Associate Justice of the Supreme Court of the United States and 9th Governor of New Hampshire.

Eastman was the uncle of Ira Allen Eastman, a United States Representative from New Hampshire.

References

External links
Biographical Directory of the United States Congress

1782 births
1856 deaths
People from Gilmanton, New Hampshire
American people of English descent
National Republican Party members of the United States House of Representatives from New Hampshire
Members of the New Hampshire House of Representatives
New Hampshire state senators
People from Farmington, New Hampshire
New Hampshire lawyers
American lawyers admitted to the practice of law by reading law
19th-century American lawyers
Members of the United States House of Representatives from New Hampshire